The Bulgaria women's national softball team is the national team of the Bulgaria. It is governed by the  Bulgarian Softball Federation.

Results
 World Championship

 nc = not competed

 European Championship

 nc = not competed

 ESF Junior Girls Championship

 nc = not competed

References

External links
 Official website BSF
 International Softball Federation

Softball
Women's national softball teams
Softball in Bulgaria